Suusamyr Too is a mountain range in internal Tian Shan in Kyrgyzstan. It separates Suusamyr Valley and Toluk Saragat Valley. The length of the range is 126 km, and height up to 4048m. It is composed of granite, and schist of lower Paleozoic.

References

Mountain ranges of Kyrgyzstan
Naryn Region
Osh Region
Jalal-Abad Region
Mountain ranges of the Tian Shan